Frank Fitzgerald (1885–1939) was Governor of Michigan.

Frank Fitzgerald may also refer to:

 Frank T. Fitzgerald (1857–1907), U.S. Representative from New York
 Frank M. Fitzgerald (1955–2004), American lawyer and politician
 Frank Fitzgerald (Wisconsin politician), Irish-born Wisconsin politician
 Franky Fitzgerald, fictional character in Skins
 Frankie Fitzgerald (born 1985), British actor
 Franklin Fitzgerald, anchor for NASA Edge
 Frank FitzGerald (judge), American football player and judge

See also
 Frances FitzGerald (disambiguation)